Stercuronium iodide (INN, USAN) (developmental code names MYC-1080, MYSC-1080) is an aminosteroid neuromuscular blocking agent which was never marketed. It acts as a competitive antagonist of the nicotinic acetylcholine receptor (nAChR), and is also reported to be an acetylcholinesterase inhibitor.

References

Acetylcholinesterase inhibitors
Muscle relaxants
Nicotinic antagonists
Quaternary ammonium compounds
Neuromuscular blockers